Mouse Sonar is a computer accessibility feature available in Microsoft Windows versions since Windows ME.
When Mouse Sonar is enabled, releasing the Ctrl key causes several concentric circles to appear around the pointer for a short time.
This may be especially useful to locate the pointer on contrast-rich or colorful background.
The Mouse Sonar feature is disabled by default, and it may be turned on using the Mouse Control Panel applet (details may vary with different Windows versions).
Programmatically, the Mouse Sonar state may be accessed with the SystemParametersInfo Windows API function in conjunction with the symbolic value SPI_GETMOUSESONAR (= 0x101C, used to retrieve state information) or SPI_SETMOUSESONAR (= 0x101D, used to enable or disable the feature) for the first function parameter, defined in most newer Windows header files.

Windows components